Royalton Township may refer to:

 Royalton Township, Michigan
 Royalton Township, Pine County, Minnesota
 Royalton Township, Fulton County, Ohio
 Royalton Township, Cuyahoga County, Ohio

Township name disambiguation pages